Lynnwood is the name of three places in the State of Pennsylvania in the United States of America:

 Lynnwood, Fayette County, Pennsylvania 
 Lynnwood, Luzerne County, Pennsylvania
 a portion of the census-designated place of Lynnwood-Pricedale, Pennsylvania in Westmoreland County